In mathematics and theoretical computer science, analysis of Boolean functions is the study of real-valued functions on  or  (such functions are sometimes known as pseudo-Boolean functions) from a spectral perspective. The functions studied are often, but not always, Boolean-valued, making them Boolean functions. The area has found many applications in combinatorics, social choice theory, random graphs, and theoretical computer science, especially in hardness of approximation, property testing, and PAC learning.

Basic concepts
We will mostly consider functions defined on the domain . Sometimes it is more convenient to work with the domain  instead.

Similarly, for us a Boolean function is a -valued function, though often it is more convenient to consider -valued functions instead.

Fourier expansion
Every real-valued function  has a unique expansion as a multilinear polynomial:

(Note that even if the function is 0-1 valued this is not a sum mod 2, but just an ordinary sum of real numbers.)

This is the Hadamard transform of the function , which is the Fourier transform in the group .

The Fourier coefficients can be calculated using an inner product:

Parseval's identity states that

If we skip , then we get the variance of :

Fourier degree and Fourier levels 
The degree of a function  is the maximum  such that  for some set  of size .

It is convenient to decompose the Fourier expansion into levels: the Fourier coefficient  is on level .

We similarly define .

Influence
The 'th influence of a function  can be defined in two equivalent ways:

 

If  is Boolean then  is the probability that flipping the 'th coordinate flips the value of the function:

If  then  doesn't depend on the 'th coordinate.

The total influence of a Boolean function is also the average sensitivity of the function. The sensitivity of a Boolean function  at a given point is the number of coordinates  such that if we flip the 'th coordinate, the value of the function changes. The average value of this quantity is exactly the total influence.

The total influence can also be defined using the discrete Laplacian of the Hamming graph, suitably normalized:  .

A generalized form of influence is the -stable influence, defined by:

The corresponding total influences is

One can prove that a function  has at most “constantly” many
“stably-influential” coordinates:

Noise stability
Concretely, we can generate a pair of -correlated random variables by first choosing  uniformly at random, and then choosing  according to one of the following two equivalent rules, applied independently to each coordinate:

The noise stability of a function  at  can be defined in two equivalent ways:

If  is Boolean, then this is the probability that the value of  changes if we flip each coordinate with probability , independently.

Noise operator
The noise operator  is an operator taking a function  and returning another function  given by

When , the noise operator can also be defined using a continuous-time Markov chain in which each bit is flipped independently with rate 1. This Markov chain is generated by the Laplacian of the Hamming graph, and this relates total influence to the noise operator.

Noise stability can be defined in terms of the noise operator: .

Hypercontractivity
For , the -norm of a function  is defined by

We also define 

Hypercontractivity is closely related to the logarithmic Sobolev inequalities of functional analysis.

p-Biased analysis

In these situations it is customary to consider functions over the domain . For , the p-biased measure  is given by

This measure can be generated by choosing each coordinate independently to be 1 with probability  and 0 with probability .

The classical Fourier characters are no longer orthogonal with respect to this measure. Instead, we use the following characters:

We can extend the definitions of influence and the noise operator to the p-biased setting by using their spectral definitions.

Influence
The 's influence is given by

The total influence is the sum of the individual influences:

Noise operator

The noise operator is then given by

Using this we can define the noise stability and the noise sensitivity, as before.

Russo–Margulis formula
The Russo–Margulis formula (also called the Margulis–Russo formula) states that for monotone Boolean functions ,

The Russo–Margulis formula is key for proving sharp threshold theorems such as Friedgut's.

Gaussian space
One of the deepest results in the area, the invariance principle, connects the distribution of functions on the Boolean cube  to their distribution on Gaussian space, which is the space  endowed with the standard -dimensional Gaussian measure.

Many of the basic concepts of Fourier analysis on the Boolean cube have counterparts in Gaussian space:

 The counterpart of the Fourier expansion in Gaussian space is the Hermite expansion, which is an expansion to an infinite sum (converging in ) of multivariate Hermite polynomials.
 The counterpart of total influence or average sensitivity for the indicator function of a set is Gaussian surface area, which is the Minkowski content of the boundary of the set.
 Hypercontractivity holds (with appropriate parameters) in Gaussian space as well.

Gaussian space is more symmetric than the Boolean cube (for example, it is rotation invariant), and supports continuous arguments which may be harder to get through in the discrete setting of the Boolean cube. The invariance principle links the two settings, and allows deducing results on the Boolean cube from results on Gaussian space.

Basic results

Friedgut–Kalai–Naor theorem
If  has degree at most 1, then  is either constant, equal to a coordinate, or equal to the negation of a coordinate. In particular,  is a dictatorship: a function depending on at most one coordinate.

The Friedgut–Kalai–Naor theorem, also known as the FKN theorem, states that if  almost has degree 1 then it is close to a dictatorship.

Similarly, a Boolean function of degree at most  depends on at most  coordinates, making it a junta (a function depending on a constant number of coordinates), where  is an absolute constant equal to at least 1.5, and at most 4.41, as shown by Wellens. The Kindler–Safra theorem generalizes the Friedgut–Kalai–Naor theorem to this setting. It states that if  satisfies  then  is -close to a Boolean function of degree at most .

Kahn–Kalai–Linial theorem
The Poincaré inequality for the Boolean cube (which follows from formulas appearing above) states that for a function ,

This implies that .

The Kahn–Kalai–Linial theorem, also known as the KKL theorem, states that if  is Boolean then .

The bound given by the Kahn–Kalai–Linial theorem is tight, and is achieved by the Tribes function of Ben-Or and Linial:

The Kahn–Kalai–Linial theorem was one of the first results in the area, and was the one introducing hypercontractivity into the context of Boolean functions.

Friedgut's junta theorem
If  is an -junta (a function depending on at most  coordinates) then  according to the Poincaré inequality.

Friedgut's theorem is a converse to this result. It states that for any , the function  is -close to a Boolean junta depending on  coordinates.

Invariance principle
The invariance principle generalizes the Berry–Esseen theorem to non-linear functions.

More formally, let  be a univariate Lipschitz function, let , let , and let
. Suppose that . Then

The invariance principle was the key ingredient in the original proof of the Majority is Stablest theorem.

Some applications

Linearity testing
A Boolean function  is linear if it satisfies , where . It is not hard to show that the Boolean linear functions are exactly the characters .

In property testing we want to test whether a given function is linear. It is natural to try the following test: choose  uniformly at random, and check that . If  is linear then it always passes the test. Blum, Luby and Rubinfeld showed that if the test passes with probability  then  is -close to a Fourier character. Their proof was combinatorial.

Bellare et al. gave an extremely simple Fourier-analytic proof, that also shows that if the test succeeds with probability , then  is correlated with a Fourier character. Their proof relies on the following formula for the success probability of the test:

Arrow's theorem
Arrow's impossibility theorem states that for three and more candidates, the only unanimous voting rule for which there is always a Condorcet winner is a dictatorship.

The usual proof of Arrow's theorem is combinatorial. Kalai gave an alternative proof of this result in the case of three candidates using Fourier analysis.

The FKN theorem implies that if  is a rule for which there is almost always a Condorcet winner, then  is close to a dictatorship.

Sharp thresholds
A classical result in the theory of random graphs states that the probability that a  random graph is connected tends to  if . In contrast, the probability that a  graph contains a triangle tends to  when .

Friedgut's sharp threshold theorem states, roughly speaking, that a monotone graph property (a graph property is a property which doesn't depend on the names of the vertices) has a sharp threshold unless it is correlated with the appearance of small subgraphs. This theorem has been widely applied to analyze random graphs and percolation.

On a related note, the KKL theorem implies that the width of threshold window is always at most .

Majority is stablest
Let  denote the majority function on  coordinates. Sheppard's formula gives the asymptotic noise stability of majority:

.

There are Boolean functions with larger noise stability. For example, a dictatorship  has noise stability .

The Majority is Stablest theorem states, informally, then the only functions having noise stability larger than majority have influential coordinates.

The first proof of this theorem used the invariance principle in conjunction with an isoperimetric theorem of Borell in Gaussian space; since then more direct proofs were devised.

Majority is Stablest implies that the Goemans–Williamson approximation algorithm for MAX-CUT is optimal, assuming the unique games conjecture. This implication, due to Khot et al., was the impetus behind proving the theorem.

References

Boolean algebra
Mathematical optimization
Theoretical computer science